Ringelbach may stand for:

Ringelbach (Felchbach), a river of Bavaria, Germany, tributary of the Felchbach
Ringelbach (Üßbach), a river of Rhineland-Palatinate, Germany, tributary of the Üßbach